James Holland McCombs (August 5, 1901 – June 29, 1991) was an American journalist.

Born in Martin, Tennessee, Holland McCombs became a correspondent for Time magazine in 1935, and later bureau chief for Time and Life in Rio de Janeiro, Buenos Aires, Mexico City, and Dallas.

In 1957, he collaborated on the book King Ranch with Tom Lea III.

He died at age 89 at his home in San Antonio, Texas.  The Holland McCombs Center at the University of Tennessee at Martin is named for him.

External links
 University of Tennessee-Martin biographical note and index to Holland McCombs archives
 Holland McCombs, "As It Was on a Martin Farm in the Early Century" (1972)

1901 births
1991 deaths
American male journalists
20th-century American journalists
20th-century American non-fiction writers
20th-century American male writers
People from Martin, Tennessee
People from San Antonio
American expatriates in Brazil
American expatriates in Argentina
American expatriates in Mexico